Branch Township is a civil township of Mason County in the U.S. state of Michigan.  As of the 2010 census, the township population was 1,328. Branch Township was named after Branch County, Michigan.

Communities
 Branch is an unincorporated community on US 10 on the boundary between Mason and Lake counties. The Branch ZIP code 49402 also serves the eastern part of Branch Township.
Walhalla is slightly more than one mile north of the Pere Marquette River. Walhalla also was the home office to the Michigan Womyn's Music Festival.

Geography

Demographics
As of the census of 2000, there were 1,181 people, 506 households, and 332 families residing in the township. The racial makeup of the township was 97.88% White, 0.34% African American, 0.68% Native American, 0.25% Asian, 0.25% from other races, and 0.59% from two or more races. Hispanic or Latino of any race were 2.37% of the population.

There were 506 households, out of which 25.7% had children under the age of 18 living with them, 54.0% were married couples living together, 8.7% had a female householder with no husband present, and 34.2% were non-families. 27.3% of all households were made up of individuals, and 9.9% had someone living alone who was 65 years of age or older.  The average household size was 2.33 and the average family size was 2.79.

In the township the population was spread out, with 21.4% under the age of 18, 6.4% from 18 to 24, 27.9% from 25 to 44, 28.7% from 45 to 64, and 15.5% who were 65 years of age or older.  The median age was 41 years. For every 100 females, there were 99.5 males.  For every 100 females age 18 and over, there were 95.8 males.

The median income for a household in the township was $27,593, and the median income for a family was $32,500. Males had a median income of $27,159 versus $20,921 for females. The per capita income for the township was $15,659.  About 6.8% of families and 9.9% of the population were below the poverty line, including 17.1% of those under age 18 and 6.3% of those age 65 or over.

References 

Townships in Mason County, Michigan
Townships in Michigan